Aden Young (born 30 November 1971) is a Canadian-Australian actor. He is best known for his portrayal of Daniel Holden in the SundanceTV drama Rectify, for which he was twice nominated for the Critics' Choice Television Award for Best Actor in a Drama Series. He has appeared in American, Canadian and Australian productions.

Early life
Young was born in Toronto, Ontario, Canada. His father Chip Young, an American born in Missouri, was a well-known CBC broadcaster and children's book author, as well as composer of Canadian classic 'Honky The Christmas Goose', while his mother is a nurse from Newcastle, Australia. His family left Toronto for Australia in 1981. Young attended Galston High and Australian Theatre For Young People as a teenager.

Career

As an actor
Young was cast in his first role, as a young Frenchman in Bruce Beresford's acclaimed religious epic Black Robe (1991) on his 18th birthday. International acclaim followed and Young was dubbed "the next Marlon Brando" in France and "the next Mel Gibson" in Hollywood but returned to Australia to support the local industry and focus on projects that he was more drawn to.

He took the lead role in groundbreaking Australian arthouse noir film Broken Highway (1993), directed by pioneering female filmmaker Laurie McInnes, which screened in competition in Cannes but received polarized reviews.

Paul Cox's Exile was filmed soon after, described in Variety as "an ambitious, sometimes hallucinatory drama that tackles themes difficult to bring off successfully in the cinema". The two clashed dramatically during filming, but formed a lifelong friendship that led to Young becoming part of Cox's film family (Chris Haywood explains "Working with Cox is not dissimilar to being one of the Musketeers or part of a pirate crew") editing, appearing and helping out on many Cox productions. Exile screened in competition at Berlin Film Festival, Montreal World Film Festival, Toronto Film Festival and Warsaw Film Festival but did not receive a theatrical release.

Young was nominated for an Australian Film Institute Best Actor award and won a Film Critics Circle of Australia Best Actor award for his role as the "ratty-looking loser" Psycho Joe opposite Ben Mendelsohn in Metal Skin (1994), Geoffrey Wright's examination of suburban hopelessness and revhead subculture, which screened internationally in competition at Venice Film Festival and Stockholm Film Festival amongst others. One reviewer wrote that "Young's depiction of this unsettling metamorphosis is central to the film's success." Geoffrey Wright stated "There could be no dispute that he is one of the best actors in the country."

After making Australian films River Street, Cosi, Hotel de Love and Paradise Road in quick succession, Young portrayed a starving Polish sculptor who spurns his lover Jessica Lange in US film Cousin Bette and as slacker desperado Buck in Under Heaven, a modern reworking of Henry James novel The Wings of the Dove.

The early 2000s saw him starring as a traumatized Canadian soldier in War Bride, a German priest in Serenades, and smaller roles in The Crocodile Hunter: Collision Course and a doctor in Cox's Molokai.

In 2004 he signed onto the Sydney Theatre Company production of Hedda Gabler as Cate Blanchett's tortured alcoholic lover Ejlert Lovberg. The production also had a 2006 season at Brooklyn Academy of Music and spawned documentary In the Company of Actors.

Compelling film cameos followed, in WW1 drama Beneath Hill 60 and French film The Tree, as Charlotte Gainsbourg's husband before starring as a besieged father dying from tetanus in the Kriv Stenders period gothic western Dark Frontier aka Lucky Country.

Young reunited with Beresford for Mao's Last Dancer (2009), based on the 2003 best-selling autobiography of Chinese ballet dancer Li Cunxin, playing a Texan oil tycoon. Beresford stated that Young's "a very cooperative and thoughtful actor."

Young mimed the hit song "Even Though I'm A Woman", by the Australian female indie supergroup Seeker Lover Keeper, in the 2011 music video directed by Natalie Van Dungen. He played American techno geek Meyer in the Jason Statham/Robert De Niro action film Killer Elite and performed a cameo as Dr Victor Frankenstein in I, Frankenstein.

In June 2012, Young was announced as the lead character Daniel Holden in the SundanceTV Southern Gothic series Rectify, which follows Holden's journey when he is released back to his family in a small Southern town after 19 years on Death Row for the murder of his girlfriend, following new evidence. His critically acclaimed performance was hailed as "a haunted wonder" with Variety proclaiming "Aden Young's portrait of Daniel is one of the greatest performances to ever grace any screen, without question. It's a travesty he hasn't been nominated for every single acting award in the TV world. The entertainment industry should make up new awards just to give to him." Rectify was announced as a Peabody Award winner in April 2015 and Young has received two Critics Choice Best Actor nominations for Seasons 2 and 3. Rectify was in the 2018 Guinness Book of Records as "Highest Rated TV Series" for its Metacritic rating of 99.

Young played lawyer Stephen Roche in the well received Don't Tell, the true story of a young Queensland woman who sued the church over sexual abuse she suffered at her Anglican school. The film also starred Jack Thompson and Rachel Griffiths. Young was nominated for Best Supporting Actor in the Film Critics Circle of Australia Awards.

In 2017 Young took the lead in Damnation before departing over creative differences.

He will play villain Cyrus Mendenhall in Canadian indie drama Angelique's Isle set for release in 2018 and stars in upcoming romantic comedy Elsewhere.

As a director
Young directed the acclaimed short film The Rose of Ba Ziz (2007), adapted from a children's book written by his father; the film was made over five days on a shoestring budget of $700 and featured Hugo Weaving, Roy Billing, Odessa Young and an appearance by his significant other, Australian singer Loene Carmen, who also co-composed the film's score with Jed Kurzel. Additionally, Young directed the AFI award-winning 25-minute film The Order (1999).

Young edited Paul Cox documentaries Kalaupapa Heaven Tajiri and feature film Salvation. He also directed Carmen's music videos for "Everyone You Ever Knew (Is Coming Back To Haunt You" (2015) and "Nashville High" (2007) as well as editing her music video "Mimic the Rain" (2009).

Personal life
Young has two sons, Dutch (born 2007) and Chester (born 2011), with his longtime partner, Australian singer-songwriter-musician-actress Loene Carmen. They married in Zebulon, Georgia while filming season 2 of Rectify in 2014.

A portrait of Young by artist James Powditch was a 2008 Archibald Prize finalist. Young also appears in Powditch's 2012 work Berserk Warriors.

Filmography

As actor

Film

Television

As director/writer/editor

Awards and nominations
Film Critic's Association of Australia Best Actor Supporting Role Nomination forDon't Tell'
Blood in the Snow Canadian Film Festival Award for Best Actor - Winner for The Unseen (2016)
Critics' Choice Television Award for Best Actor in a Drama Series Nomination for Rectify (2016)
Critics' Choice Television Award for Best Actor in a Drama Series Nomination for Rectify (2015)
Satellite Award for Best Actor – Television Series Drama Nomination for Rectify (2013)
Australian Film Institute Awards Nomination for Best Actor in a Lead Role for River Street (1996)
Australian Film Institute Awards Nomination for Best Actor in a Lead Role for Metal Skin (1995)
Australian Film Critics Circle Award for Best Actor for Metal Skin'' (1995)

References

External links

Aden Young ('Rectify') on Critics' Choice nod for playing 'confused and broken' ex-con - Gold Derby 2015
Aden Young - Rectify Golden Globes Interview
Aden Young Delivers Fiery Response To Critics Of His Slowburning Series Rectify - Daily Telegraph 2014
Seeker Lover Keeper clip 'Even Though I'm A Woman' - 2011
Seeker Lover Keeper clip 'Even Though I'm A Woman' behind the scenes - 2011
 "The Young And Restless" - The Sunday Age by Peter Wilmoth, 24 April 1994
In the Company of Actors
The Rose Of Ba Ziz (2007), 8 mins, dir Aden Young
The Order, 25mins, dir Aden Young

1972 births
Living people
Male actors from Toronto
Australian male film actors
Australian film directors
Australian male television actors
Canadian emigrants to Australia
Film directors from Toronto
Canadian people of American descent